The mixed team standard competition at the 2006 Asian Games in Doha was held from 6 December to 14 December at the Al-Dana Indoor Hall.

Schedule
All times are Arabia Standard Time (UTC+03:00)

Results
Legend
BH — Buchholz system

Round 1

Round 2

Round 3

Round 4

Round 5

Round 6

Round 7

Round 8

Round 9

Summary

References 

Official Website
Results

Chess at the 2006 Asian Games